Ramseier Glacier is a steep cirque-type glacier, 5 nautical miles (9 km) long, flowing southwest to enter Byrd Glacier immediately east of Mount Rummage. Named by the Advisory Committee on Antarctic Names (US-ACAN) for Rene O. Ramseier, glaciologist at McMurdo and South Pole Stations, 1960–61 and 1961-62 seasons.

Glaciers of Oates Land